Colasposoma flavolimbatum is a species of leaf beetle of Algeria, described by Maurice Pic in 1905.

References

flavolimbatum
Beetles of North Africa
Taxa named by Maurice Pic
Beetles described in 1905